The March of Merseburg was a short-lived march of the Holy Roman Empire. It comprised the lands of the Polabian Slavs beyond the margravial residence at Merseburg on the Saale river. 

Like the neighbouring marches of Meissen and Zeitz, the Merseburg march was created by Emperor Otto I in the division of the vast Marca Geronis east of the Elbe and Saale rivers, following the death of Margrave Gero in 965. Merseburg, located in the Hassegau on the eastern border of the Saxon duchy, had been the site of a fortress and a Königspfalz built at the behest of King Henry the Fowler from about 919.

The first and only margrave at Merseburg was Gunther who had rendered services accompanying Otto on his Italian campaigns. However, when Gunther participated in the revolt of Duke Henry II of Bavaria, he was deposed as margrave in 976 and lost his territory to Margrave Thietmar of Meissen. Shortly before his death in the 982 Battle of Stilo, Gunther reconciled with Emperor Otto II and his march was restored.

Upon Gunther's death, Merseburg was reunited with the marches of Meissen and Zeitz under the rule of Margrave Rikdag of Meissen, who thus temporarily reunited all of the southern Marca Geronis save the Saxon Eastern March.

The March of Merseburg may refer to the earlier Marca Geronis, which also had its capital at Merseburg.

See also
Bishopric of Merseburg
Merseburg Incantations

Merseburg
Burgenlandkreis
States and territories established in the 960s
960s establishments in the Holy Roman Empire
965 establishments